El Morado Natural Monument is a Chilean Natural Monument located in the Cajón del Maipo, Santiago Metropolitan Region. The monument is a glacial cirque and is part of the El Volcán River basin. Cerro El Morado dominates the landscape of this protected area. It is home to the San Francisco Glacier.

See also
San José (volcano)
Marmolejo
Embalse El Yeso

References
 Monumento Natural El Morado

Natural monuments of Chile
Principal Cordillera
Protected areas of Santiago Metropolitan Region